The 1994 Winnipeg Blue Bombers finished in 1st place in the East Division with a 13–5 record. They attempted to make a third straight Grey Cup appearance, but they lost to Baltimore in the East Final.

Offseason

CFL Draft

Preseason

Regular season

Season standings

Season schedule

Playoffs

East Semi-Final

East Final

Awards and records
CFL's Most Outstanding Canadian Award – Gerald Wilcox (SB)

1994 CFL All-Stars
SB – Gerald Wilcox, CFL All-Star
OT – Chris Walby, CFL All-Star

References

Winnipeg Blue Bombers seasons
Winn